Henry Hatton ( – 31 July 1853) was an Irish-born merchant, ship builder and political figure in Nova Scotia. He represented Pictou township from 1836 to 1843 in the Nova Scotia House of Assembly as a Conservative.

He was born in Gorey, Wexford, the son of Robert Hatton, a Dublin barrister, and Jane Tomkins. He came to Nova Scotia in 1813 with his family, settling in Pictou. He married Mary Ann Brown (b.c.1800 Newcastle upon Tyne - d.3 April 1876 Pictou).

Hatton became one of the most active shipbuilders in Pictou County. He owned a series of buildings and a wharf, known as Hatton's Wharf, at the foot of South Market Street. Henry was a central figure in the construction of St. James' Anglican Church in Pictou. He died in Pictou, and is buried with Mary and his parents in the St. James Churchyard.

References 

1853 deaths
Nova Scotia pre-Confederation MLAs
Year of birth uncertain
People from Gorey
People from Pictou County